Cork is a city in Ireland, located in the South-West Region, in the province of Munster. It is the second largest city in the Republic of Ireland and the third most populous on the island of Ireland. Eight association football clubs/teams or franchises from Cork have represented the city in the League of Ireland. In 1924–25 Fordsons became the first team from the city to join the league. Since then, apart from the two seasons, 1982–83 and 1983–84, the league has featured at least one Cork team. The current representative, Cork City F.C., was elected to the league in 1984–85. Between them, teams from Cork have won the league title on twelve occasions.

Clubs

 Where multiple names are listed, the clubs have changed names. See below

Timeline

Champions

List of winners by season

A Division

Premier Division

List of winners by club

References

Cork
Association football in Cork (city)